The Octatron SkySeer, also known as The Octatron, is a close range unmanned aerial vehicle (UAV) designed for easy transport and launch. It is designed and manufactured by Octatron, Incorporated in St. Petersburg, Florida, USA.

Intended for short-range operations, the electric-powered SkySeer resembles a normal radio controlled airplane or two-meter glider. The SkySeer is hand-launched by its operator and its flight functions can be handled by GPS including landings. The range is approximately two miles/3.2 km and is extendable via Octatron's NetWeaver interface.

A fully loaded SkySeer retails for approximately US$25,000 to $30,000 which includes all electronics, video surveillance equipment, ground station and computer interfaces. Video interface is in real time and allows the operator to literally see what the drone sees and to record it as such store up to twenty hours of high-quality MPEG-2 format video which can then be transferred to DVD or Macromedia Flash.

The Los Angeles County Sheriff's Department is currently experimenting with the SkySeer as a means of crime prevention. At present, the experiment has been suspended by the Federal Aviation Administration due to that agency's claim of lack of adequate permits. Although the FAA does not regulate model aircraft, it does have jurisdiction over unmanned aerial vehicles.

Airframe specifications

Wingspan:  6.5' (1.98m)
Weight:  3.125 lbs (1.42 kg)
Endurance:  45 to 60 minutes at cruise speed of 23 mph (37 km/h)

References

External links
Report by the BBC about the SkySeer's use in Los Angeles
Slide show of LASD experiment at flickr.com

Unmanned aerial vehicles of the United States